The Ordabassy Square also well-known as Al Farabi Square is a crossing in the city Shymkent (Kazakhstan), at the intersection of three main streets bearing the names of three wise Kazakh leader, who laid the foundation of unity of the Kazakh people: Tole Bi, Ayteke Bi and Kazybek Bi at the village Ordabassy near the city.

Independence Monument
The Independence Monument in located in the center of the Ordabassy Square and is a 34-meter three-edged stele supporting an eight-meter female figure "Zher-ana" - "Mother Earth". The stele symbolizes national unity. Each face of the stele holds sayings from late medieval figures. The monument was designed by Nasir Rustemov and Bakhytzhan Ashirbayev. The monument was funded by local businessmen at a project cost of 48 million tenge.

Opening
The Monument of Independence opened on 22 September 2009. The decoration of the event was by creative collectives. The opening was attended by President of the Republic of Kazakhstan Nursultan Nazarbayev.

References 

Shymkent
Tourist attractions in Shymkent
Monuments and memorials in Kazakhstan
Streets in Shymkent